A jerkin is a man's short close-fitting jacket.

Jerkin may also refer to:

 Falconer's term for a male gyrfalcon
 Jerkinhead roof, a roof with a squared-off gable 
 Jerkin', a hip hop dance movement that originated in Los Angeles

See Also
Gherkin (disambiguation)